Shivlal Yadav  (born 26 January 1957) is a former Indian cricketer who played in 35 Test matches and seven One Day Internationals from 1979 to 1987.

A right arm offbreak bowler, he made his Test debut in 1979 during a rebuilding stage in Indian cricket with their spin quartet breaking up.
His debut series, against Australia, was a success with 24 wickets in the five Tests and he did enough to force Srinivasaraghavan Venkataraghavan out of the side. He played regularly for India until 1987, forming a new spin trio with Shastri and Doshi.

He made an impressive start by taking 7 wickets on his debut Test against Australia at Bangalore in 1979. He played a key role in India's win against Australia in the very next Test match he played. He got rid of three batsmen – Allan Border, Dav Whatmore and Kevin Wright in quick succession in the fourth innings ensuring a comfortable win for India. Australia required 279 runs to win but ended up being all out for just 125. He ended up with 4 wickets in that innings and 6 wickets in that Test.

He lost his place in the side briefly in a period in the early 1980s but returned successfully against the touring West Indian side in 1983–84 where he took 5 wickets for 131 runs in the first innings of the 4th Test at Bombay.

Against Australia in 1985–86 he picked up 15 wickets in the 3 Test series. This haul included career best match figures of 8/118 in the Test at Sydney. His best innings figures came against Sri Lanka at Nagpur with 5/76. He brought up his 100th Test wicket in his penultimate Test, against Pakistan.

In 2014, Supreme Court of India has named Shivlal Yadav as a national manager, which will look on the work of BCCI other than IPL-7. This is on temporary basis.

References

1957 births
Living people
India Test cricketers
India One Day International cricketers
Indian cricketers
South Zone cricketers
Hyderabad cricketers
Indian cricket administrators
India national cricket team selectors
Presidents of the Board of Control for Cricket in India
Cricketers from Hyderabad, India